Rob Adams (born Robert Lee Adams II; February 27, 1970) is an American actor, owner of The Actors Workshop, film acting coach, offensive coordinator at Tesoro High School and former college football quarterback.

Early years
Adams was born in St. Louis, Missouri, to actor/radio personality R. J. Adams and documentary producer Diane C. Adams. After finishing college Adams briefly coached football before following in his father's footsteps as an actor/film acting coach. In 1992, Adams took it upon himself to terminate a disruptive teacher and at the same time dismissed several students from the program. As a result, he was  made a full partner in the ownership of The Actors Workshop.

While growing up in Mission Viejo, California, Adams played Quarterback for the Jr. All- American Cowboys until he entered his freshman year at Mission Viejo High School, playing QB for the Diablos until graduating in 1988. His role as Quarterback continued with both the Saddleback Gauchos and Cal State Hayward Pioneers. During his tenure at the workshop,  Adams served as the J.V. Head Football Coach with his Alma Mater, Mission Viejo Diablos before moving on to Varsity QB coach and Offensive Coordinator with the Mustangs of Trabuco Hills High School. In 2002, Adams gave up his football duties to devote himself as a full-time acting coach and Film/TV acting career.

Film/TV
During the past twenty years Adams has appeared in dozens of Film and Television roles including appearances on General Hospital, Days of Our Lives, Silk Stalkings, The Lone Gunman, Snowday and Forrest Gump. Currently in production, "Abeo Pharisee" and "The Studio Club" which Adams stars as CSI Investigator Brenton Troy.

Film acting coach
In 1992 at the age of 22, Rob Adams started coaching acting and in 1997, became director of The Actors Workshop founded in 1978. It was under the direction of Rob that The Actors Workshop opened its North Hollywood studio in 2000. Rob has trained several successful actors which include, Rampage Jackson, Warren G, Tiffany, Sarah Lancaster, Wayne Bastrup, Annet Mahendru, David Farkas and Randy Josselyn. The Actors Workshop is currently ranked as one of the top 3 Acting School in California. In March 2022, Rob started his 31st year as an acting coach making him one of the longest tenured coaches in the business.

Little league president
In 2016, Rob Adams became the president of Ladera Ranch Little League. In his first year as president, the Majors All Star team was a runner up in the Sub Sectional Division of Southern California, and nearly went to the Little League World Series. Rob finished his final year as being the Ladera Ranch Little League president in 2018, and helped lead the Majors Expos to a TOC birth. He also managed the 2018 National League All Star team which finished as District 68 runners-up.

Tesoro high school football
After several years away from high school coaching,  in 2017 Adams joined the Tesoro football staff as a Junior Varsity coach. In 2019, Rob was promoted to Varsity Offensive Coordinator and QB Coach. In his 1st season the Titans offense averaged 32 points and 381 yards a game.

Family
Rob is married to Amy Adams. The couple has three children, Emma, Tyler and Rachel.

Filmography

Film

Television

References

External links
 
 

1970 births
American male film actors
American male television actors
Living people
Male actors from St. Louis
20th-century American male actors
21st-century American male actors
American acting coaches
Mission Viejo High School alumni